Charles H. O'Neill (May 1800 – November 8, 1897) was an Irish-American politician and a Democrat who served as  Mayor of Jersey City, New Jersey, from May 4, 1868 until April 10, 1869, when he resigned, and again from May 2, 1870 until May 3, 1874.

O'Neill was born in Paterson, New Jersey, working as a shoemaker, in the timber, coal and building material trades and serving as alderman before moving to Jersey City to set up business there. He was first elected as mayor in 1868, but resigned less than a year later. William Clarke was appointed to fill his unexpired term. O'Neill was elected again in 1870 and re-elected in 1872. After his second term, he was succeeded by Democrat Henry Traphagen.

O'Neill died of cirrhosis of the liver in his home in Jersey City on November 8, 1897.

References

Sources
Charles H. O'Neill at the City of Jersey City website

American people of Irish descent
Mayors of Jersey City, New Jersey
1800 births
1897 deaths
19th-century American politicians
Deaths from cirrhosis